"Just Can't Get Enough" is a song by English electronic music band Depeche Mode. It was their third single, released on 7 September 1981, a month before the release of their debut studio album, Speak & Spell. It was recorded during the summer of that year at Blackwing Studios, and was the band's first single to be released in the United States, on 18 February 1982. A riff-driven synth-pop song, "Just Can't Get Enough" was the final single to be written by founding member Vince Clarke, who left the band in November 1981.

The single version of "Just Can't Get Enough" is the same version that appears on the UK version of Speak & Spell. The 12-inch single featured a "Schizo Mix", which is an extended version with additional synth parts adding a sinister feel to the track. This version appears on the US version of Speak & Spell, the UK re-release of Speak & Spell, the re-release of The Singles 81→85 and Remixes 81–04.

In addition, the single's B-side, "Any Second Now", was the first commercially available Depeche Mode instrumental. It is included on the UK re-release of Speak & Spell. A version including vocals (the first Depeche Mode vocals to be handled by Martin Gore) appeared on the album as "Any Second Now (Voices)". There is also an extended version, the "Altered" Mix. In the United States, the B-side is "Tora! Tora! Tora!". On the album, "Tora! Tora! Tora!" is crossfaded with the previous track, "Photographic", but on the single, the introduction is clean.

The single reached number 8 on the UK Singles Chart and number 26 on the US Hot Dance Club Play chart, making it their highest-charting single at the time on both counts. It also became the band's first (and biggest) hit in Australia, reaching number 4.

Record World said that "Music box synthesizers toy with a catchy melody line and a
chorus chants the title over and over again while a tape-recorded rhythm track provides the dance beat."

Music video
The "Just Can't Get Enough" video, directed by Clive Richardson, was the band's first, and is the only video by the band which includes Vince Clarke.

The exterior scenes in the video are filmed at The Southbank Centre that is, the undercroft and a now demolished stairway at the eastern corner of the Royal Festival Hall.

Track listings
7": Mute / 7Mute16 (UK)
 "Just Can't Get Enough"– 3:45
 "Any Second Now"– 3:08

12": Mute / 12Mute16 (UK)
 "Just Can't Get Enough (Schizo Mix)" – 6:46
 "Any Second Now (Altered)" – 5:43

CD: Mute / CDMute16 (D)1
 "Just Can't Get Enough (Schizo Mix)" – 6:46
 "Any Second Now (Altered)" – 5:43
 "Just Can't Get Enough (7" Version)" – 3:45

CD: Mute / CDMute16 (UK)2
 "Just Can't Get Enough"– 3:45
 "Any Second Now"– 3:08
 "Just Can't Get Enough (Schizo Mix)" – 6:46
 "Any Second Now (Altered)"– 5:43

7": Sire / 50029-7 (US)
 "Just Can't Get Enough" – 3:45
 "Tora! Tora! Tora! (Single Version)" – 4:17

CD: Sire / 40291-2 (US)2
 "Just Can't Get Enough"– 3:45
 "Any Second Now"– 3:08
 "Just Can't Get Enough (Schizo Mix)" – 6:46
 "Any Second Now (Altered)"– 5:43

Notes
1: CD released in 1988
2: CD released in 1991
All songs written by Vince Clarke except for "Tora! Tora! Tora! (Single Version)", written by Martin Gore.

Live versions
The song was played live on almost every Depeche Mode tour and various live versions have been released on live albums and concert videos or as B-sides over the years. The schizo mix live version recorded at the London Hammersmith Odeon on October 25 in 1982 that is featured on the 1983 Love in Itself 2 and Live Tracks 12" single became a hit in the Netherlands and Belgium in its own right in 1985. It was never released as a single A-side, but was played extensively on Radio Veronica by various DJs and entered the Dutch and Belgian charts, making the Top 10 (even though the Love in Itself 2 and live tracks 12" officially did not qualify for the singles chart, as it was labelled a mini-album).

Charts

Weekly charts

Year-end charts

Certifications

The Saturdays version

"Just Can't Get Enough" was covered by English-Irish girl group the Saturdays. It was one of the official Comic Relief singles for 2009.

Chart performance
On 8 March 2009, the song entered the UK Singles Chart at number two, where it peaked, being beaten by Flo Rida's "Right Round" after being at number one in the midweek count, thus being the first Comic Relief single not to chart at number one in 14 years. However, it gave the Saturdays their highest chart placing at the time, outpeaking and outselling the original track, plus it marked their fourth consecutive top ten hit in the UK. The success of this single was later matched by "Forever Is Over" and beaten by "What About Us". In Scotland, the song reached number one for a week, becoming their highest-charting single on that chart alongside "What About Us". In 2010, it received a Silver certification from the BPI for sales exceeding 200,000 copies.

Music video
The music video premiered on MSN on 9 February 2009. The video shows each girl singing in a mock-'50s pin-up calendar and uses a different edit of the song, known as the "Video Mix", than the single version. It was directed by Harvey B-Brown.

Track listing
CD single(Released 2 March 2009)
 "Just Can't Get Enough" (Radio Mix) – 3:08
 "Golden Rules" – 3:50

Digital single(Released 1 March 2009)
 "Just Can't Get Enough" (Radio Mix) – 3:08
 "Just Can't Get Enough" (Video Mix) – 3:19
 "Just Can't Get Enough" (Wideboys Club Mix) – 5:08
 "Just Can't Get Enough" video – 3:32 iTunes Edition Only

Revamped Version
 "Just Can't Get Enough" (Radio Mix) – 3:08
 "Golden Rules" – 3:50
 "Just Can't Get Enough" (Video Mix) – 3:19
 "Just Can't Get Enough" (Wideboys Club Mix) – 5:08

Usage in media

 1995, Ovalteenies commercial
 1999, GAP commercial
 2003, Hyundai commercial
 2006, H&M Commercial
 2011, promotional commercials for the film Crazy, Stupid, Love.

Charts

Weekly charts

Year-end charts

Certifications

Usage in association football

In 2009, the song was adapted as a football chant by fans of Celtic F.C., specifically the Green Brigade fans.

In an interview with football website Goal.com, Depeche Mode keyboardist Andrew Fletcher commented on the use of the song by Celtic fans: "We feel honoured that the Celtic faithful are chanting our songs and are touched by it. The best thing is that they know the entire lyrics."

The football chant was also sung by Thai children from the Good Child Foundation also known as the Thai Tims, made up of children with Down syndrome. The song had been taught to them by Reamonn Gormley, a young Celtic youth team player and avid Celtic fan from the Scottish town of Blantyre who had gone to Thailand as a volunteer English language teacher for Good Child Foundation and would use English songs to teach English to them, including, amongst others, Celtic chants. In February 2011, after returning to Blantyre, Gormley was stabbed to death at the age of 19. The Thai Tims' videotaped tribute version of "Just Can't Get Enough" went viral. In memory of Reamonn Gormley, Celtic FC and Celtic Charity Fund released it as a charity single on 8 May 2011 with proceeds going to the Good Child Foundation in Thailand and Crime Stoppers in Scotland. It reached number 30 on the UK Singles Chart and number two on the Scottish Singles Chart.

As it grew in popularity, the song was adapted by fans of other football teams including English Championship side Burnley in January 2011. In February 2011, starting with the 3–2 home win over Aston Villa, then Premier League club Bolton Wanderers used the song when they scored a goal at the Reebok Stadium. Also in February 2011, Liverpool supporters adopted the song as a tribute and encouragement for the club's new Uruguayan attacker Luis Suárez. Depeche Mode's Andrew Fletcher, in spite of being a supporter of rival club Chelsea, praised the creativeness of the Liverpool fans who adopted the song. Fletcher said that bandmate David Gahan also followed Chelsea, while Martin L. Gore is a fan of Arsenal.

Usage in politics
A play on the title of the song, "I Just Khan't Get Enough", has been used by the Labour Party to promote Sadiq Khan, Mayor of London since 2016.

References

Bibliography
 </ref>

External links
 Single information from the official Depeche Mode web site
 AllMusic review 

1981 songs
1981 singles
2009 singles
Celtic F.C. songs
Comic Relief singles
Depeche Mode songs
Mute Records singles
Number-one singles in Scotland
Polydor Records singles
The Saturdays songs
Song recordings produced by Daniel Miller
Songs written by Vince Clarke
UK Independent Singles Chart number-one singles